"If You Love Somebody" is a song written by Chris Farren and Jeffrey Steele, and recorded by American country music artist Kevin Sharp.  It was released in July 1997 as the third single from his debut album Measure of a Man. The song reached number 4 on the Billboard Hot Country Singles & Tracks chart in October 1997.

Critical reception
Deborah Evans Price, of Billboard magazine reviewed the song favorably, saying that the record grabs the listener immediately and doesn't let go thanks to the "energetic percussion that opens this track and gives way to a spree of sassy fiddle lines." She goes on to say that the song is a fine example of the "vibrancy and passion he can bring to a great uptempo cut."

Chart performance
"If You Love Somebody" debuted at number 65 on the U.S. Billboard Hot Country Singles & Tracks for the week of July 26, 1997.

Year-end charts

References

1997 singles
Kevin Sharp songs
Songs written by Jeffrey Steele
Asylum Records singles
Songs written by Chris Farren (country musician)
Song recordings produced by Chris Farren (country musician)
1996 songs